Sir John Byron (1386–1450) was an English nobleman, landowner, politician, and knight. He had estates in Clayton near Manchester and at South Stoke (now Stoke Rochford) in Lincolnshire. He was Member of Parliament for Lancashire in 1421 and 1429, and for Lincolnshire in 1447.

Family 
Byron was the son and heir of Richard Byron (1354–1415), the son and heir of James Byron of Clayton (c. 1300–1355) by his wife Elizabeth de Bernake. Sir John's mother was Joan de Colwick, daughter and heiress of William de Colwick of Colwick Hall.

Marriage and issue 
Byron married Margery Booth, daughter of John Booth, with whom he had six daughters and three sons, including Nicholas Byron, who was knighted by Prince Arthur in 1502.  Nicholas inherited his father's estates.

References
 

1386 births
1450 deaths
English knights
John
People from Stoke Rochford
Members of the Parliament of England (pre-1707) for Lancashire
English MPs December 1421
English MPs 1429
English MPs 1447